The 2022 Idol Star Athletics Championships Chuseok Special was held at Goyang Gymnasium in Goyang, South Korea on July 30 and August 1, 2022, and was broadcast on MBC on September 9, 11, and 12, 2022 for three episodes.

Synopsis
The show is revived after two years of hiatus caused by COVID-19 pandemic. In this year's chuseok Idol Star Athletics Championships, MZ generation K-pop idols compete in five sport events: archery, athletics, futsal, e- sport which were already held in previous years and a newly introduced dancesport.
The teams are divided into White and Blue team. Each win from each sports competition is earned as team point.

Cast

Presenters
Jun Hyun-moo, F.T. Island's Lee Hong-gi and Twice's Dahyun were the main hosts of the show. Dancer Aiki from Street Woman Fighter fame was named as special MC for dancesport segment.

Participants
Male

Group
 NCT
 Stray Kids
 The Boyz
 ATEEZ
 CIX
 AB6IX
 EPEX
 ONEUS

 VERIVERY
 DKZ
 WEi
 Xdinary Heroes
 MCND
 DRIPPIN
 TEMPEST
 TNX

 P1Harmony
 N.Flying
 KINGDOM
 TAN
 TO1
 DKB
 YOUNITE
 ATBO

Soloist
 WOODZ (Cho Seung-youn)
 Ha Sung-woon
 Kim Jae-hwan
 Jeong Se-woon
 Kim Woo-seok
 Lee Jin-hyuk

Female

Group
 IVE
 ITZY
 STAYC
 NMIXX
 EVERGLOW
 Kep1er
 Brave Girls

 Weeekly
 BVNDIT
 LIGHTSUM
 Billlie
 PURPLE KISS
 ALICE
 CLASS:y

 Rocket Punch
 Cherry Bullet
 TRI.BE
 ICHILLIN’
 H1-KEY
 Lapillus

Soloist
 Kwon Eun-bi
 Choi Ye-na
 Jo Yu-ri
 HYNN (Park Hye-won)

Results

Men
Archery

Dancesport

Athletics

 Futsal

Women
Archery

Dancesport

Athletics

Mixed
 E-sports

Ratings

References

External links
 2022 Idol Star Athletics Championships Chuseok Special

MBC TV original programming
South Korean variety television shows
South Korean game shows
2018 in South Korean television
Idol Star Athletics Championships